The Volvo S90 is an executive sedan manufactured and marketed by Swedish automaker Volvo Cars since 2016. Its estate variant is called the Volvo V90.

Models 
For the model year of 2017 (the first model year), a short and long wheelbase sedan as well as an estate model were made available. For 2017, the short wheelbase model was sold in North America and Europe, while the long wheelbase model was primarily sold in China. Volvo has hinted at possible coupe variants, but not until at least 2020 as the Polestar 1.

S90 
Before its reveal, the first official pictures of the S90 were shown on Wednesday, 2 December 2015. The S90 was unveiled to the public in January 2016, at the North American International Auto Show in Detroit, Michigan. The S90's design was well received, winning the Production Car Design of the Year award for 2015.

While not a direct successor to the second-generation S80, the S90 replaces it as the flagship sedan in Volvo's lineup. Several trim levels are available, ranging from Momentum to Inscription. In July 2016, an optional, cosmetic R-Design package was announced. A long wheelbase version was announced and is available in the United States.

For the 2022 model year in the United Kingdom, the range was limited to the S90 Recharge, a mild-hybrid sedan. The S90 Recharge was limited to Plus and Ultimate trim levels with the T8 AWD mild-hybrid engine, a 2.0-litre  4-cylinder available with all-wheel-drive only.

S90L 
For the model year of 2017, a special stretched version of the S90 was made in China, primarily for that market. It is stretched by  behind the B pillar. This initial Chinese variant was not badged as "S90L". For the model year of 2018, this long wheelbase S90 was introduced in the United States and Europe (the short wheelbase S90 was then discontinued in the United States, but not in Europe). 

In Europe and the Middle East, the short wheelbase version still persists in models from 2018.

For the model year of 2023, an interior facelift of the S90 was made in China market.

Production
By mid-2017, the Swedish Torslandaverken Plant no longer produced the S90. Production and assembly has mainly moved to the Chinese Daqing plant. It also locally assembled (CKD) in Volvo Car Manufacturing Malaysia in Shah Alam, Malaysia and Volvo Trucks Bengaluru plant in India.

Facelift
In February 2020, the official photos of refreshed S90 were leaked along with the refreshed V90. The taillights now have sequential LED indicators & Inscription variants get chrome garnish on the front bumper.

Engines 
The S90 is only available with 2.0-litre, four-cylinder petrol and diesel engines from the VEA family (Drive-E). The more powerful petrol engines are compound charged, as is the plug-in hybrid variant called the T8. The D5 diesel engine features Volvo's new PowerPulse technology that is designed to eliminate turbo lag, as well as an i Art injection system.

Notes

References

External links 

  (International)

S90
Sedans
Plug-in hybrid vehicles
Front-wheel-drive vehicles
All-wheel-drive vehicles
Executive cars
Cars introduced in 2016
Flagship vehicles